This is a list of presidents of the institutions of the European Union (EU). Each of the institutions is headed by a president or a presidency, with some being more prominent than others. Both the President of the European Council and the President of the European Commission are sometimes wrongly termed the President of the European Union.  Most go back to 1957 but others, such as the Presidents of the Auditors or the European Central Bank have been created recently. Currently, the President of the European Commission is Ursula von der Leyen and the President of the European Council is Charles Michel.


Current officeholders

Historic officeholders

See also
President of the European Union

References

External links
EU Website – European Union Presidents
President of the European Council European-council.europa.eu
President of the European Commission ec.europa.eu
President of the European Parliament europarl.europa.eu

Institutions of the European Union